The Spirit of Ukko is the debut full-length studio album by the Finnish heavy metal band Kiuas, released on May 4, 2005 by Spinefarm Records. "Ukko" in Finnish mythology is the greatest of the pagan gods and is a Finnish male name. The Japanese version features a bonus song eponymously titled from the Winter in June EP. The third quarter piece of the song, "Across the Snows" is sung in Finnish.

Track listing 
 "The Spirit of Ukko" − 5:52
 "On Winds of Death We Ride" − 4:20
 "No More Sleep for Me" − 4:06
 "Warrior Soul" − 5:48
 "Until We Reach the Shore" − 4:27
 "Across the Snows" − 5:59
 "Thorns of a Black Rose" − 4:49
 "And the North Star Cried" − 6:59
 "Winter in June" − 4:24 (Japanese bonus track)

Credits

Band members
 Ilja Jalkanen − vocals
 Mikko Salovaara − guitars
 Markku Näreneva − drums
 Atte Tanskanen − keyboards
 Teemu Tuominen − bass

Guest musicians
 Strings on "And the North Star Cried" arranged by Mikko Salovaara and performed by the Arctic string quartet:
 Karo Tiuraniemi − violin
 Laura Airola − violin
 Suvi Oskala − viola
 Essi Toivonen − cello

Production and other
 All music and lyrics written by Mikko Salovaara, except "No More Sleep for Me" by Ilja Jalkanen.
 Mixed by Nino Laurenne at Sonic Pump Studios.
 Strings recorded at The Helsinki Pop&Jazz Conservatory by Juuso Kujala.
 Mastered by Mika Jussila at Finnvox Studios.
 Cover concept and photography by Harri Halme/Shadow Mechanics.
 Cover illustrations and logos by Janne "ToxicAngel" Pitkänen.
 Cover layout by Janne/Spinefarm.

References

2005 debut albums
Kiuas albums
Spinefarm Records albums